The Academy of Country Music Award for Female Artist of the Year is awarded to the top female artist of the past year. It is based on individual musical performance on a solo Country single or album release, as well as the overall contribution to Country Music.The following is the list of winners, with the year representing the nominated work. This Award goes to the artist. This award was one of the original awards given at the first ceremony in 1966. The first recipient was Bonnie Owens. The most recent recipient is Carly Pearce.

Recipients

Category records

Wins 
 Most wins — Miranda Lambert (9).
 Most wins from the 1960's — n/a.
 Most wins from the 1970's — Loretta Lynn (4).
 Most wins from the 1980's — Reba McEntire (4).
 Most wins from the 1990's — Reba McEntire (3).
 Most wins from the 2000's — Martina McBride and Carrie Underwood (3).
 Most wins from the 2010's — Miranda Lambert (9).

Nominations 
 Most nominated — Miranda Lambert and Reba McEntire (16).
 Most nominated from the 1960's — Bonnie Guitar and Bonnie Owens (3).
 Most nominated from the 1970's — Loretta Lynn (10).
 Most nominated from the 1980's — Crystal Gayle and Reba McEntire (6).
 Most nominated from the 1990's — Reba McEntire (7).
 Most nominated from the 2000's — Martina McBride (9).
 Most nominated from the 2010's — Miranda Lambert and Carrie Underwood (10).

References 

Academy of Country Music Awards
Music awards honoring women
Awards established in 1966
Annual events in the United States